Oskar Krejčí (born 13 July 1948 in Prague) is a Czech political scientist, who is the author of approximately thirty books and more than thousand articles in the area of political science.
 
Krejčí is a director of the Institute of the Global Studies of The Jan Amos Komensky University Prague, Czech Republic. 

In 1967 he was convicted for an attempt illegal crossing Czechoslovak-Austrian border to a suspended sentence of 14 months. In 1968 Krejčí entered the Communist Party of Czechoslovakia. Since 1975 until the end of communist regime he was a secret agent of the StB, the Czechoslovak secret service. In this position he also supervised other agents.  

Before and during the Velvet Revolution he was an adviser to two last Communist Prime Ministers of Czechoslovakia – Ladislav Adamec and Marián Čalfa. He is author of the address of the Prime Minister in whereby was in the Federal Assembly of  ČSSR designed on president Václav Havel and author of the program of the federal government of the national understanding.

He is a vocal critic of the plans of the Bush administration to install a national missile defense system on the territory of the Czech Republic and Poland.

Books 
 KREJČÍ, Oskar: War (Válka). Třetí, aktualizované a rozšířené vydání. Praha: Professional Publishing, 2022. 190 s. 
 KREJČÍ, Oskar: Geopolitics of the China. (Geopolitika Číny.) Praha: Professional Publishing, s.r.o., 2021. 492 s. 
 KREJČÍ, Oskar: International Politics (Mezinárodní politika.) 6. upravené vydání. Praha: Ekopress, 2021. 804 s. 
 KREJČÍ, Oskar: Comments and interviews Tom 3. (Komentáře a rozhovory. Díl 3.). Praha: Argument OVIA z.s., 2020. 222 s.  – Elektronická verze knihy
 KREJČÍ, Oskar: Comments and interviews Tom 2. (Komentáře a rozhovory. Díl 2.). Praha: Argument OVIA z.s., 2019. 226 s.  – Electronic version
 Velvet Revolution. (Sametová revoluce). Druhé vydání. Praha: Professional Publishing, 2019. 160 s. 
 KREJČÍ, Oskar: Comments and interviews Tom 1. (Komentáře a rozhovory. Díl 1.). Praha: Argument OVIA z.s., 2018. 115 s.  – Electronic version
 KREJČÍ, Oskar: Geopolitics of the Russia. (Geopolitika Ruska.) Praha: Professional Publishing, s.r.o., 2017. 534 pp. 
 KREJČÍ, Oskar: Geopolitics of the Central European Region. The view from Prague and Bratislava (Geopolitika středoevropského prostoru. Pohled z Prahy a Bratislavy.) 5. upravené vydání. Prague: Professional Publishing, 2016. 426 pp. 
 KREJČÍ, Oskar: International Politics (Mezinárodní politika.) 5. upravené vydání. Praha: Ekopress, 2014. 804 pp. 
 KREJČÍ, Oskar: Velvet Revolution. (Sametová revoluce). Praha: Professional Publishing, 2014. 160 p. 
 KREJČÍ, Oskar: Human Rights. (Lidská práva).  Praha: Professional Publishing, 2011. 175 s.   
 KREJČÍ, Oskar: War. (Válka). Druhé, upravené vydání. Praha: Professional Publishing, 2011. 175 s. 
 КРЕЙЧИ, Oскар: Геополитика Центральной Европы. Взгляд из Праги и Братиславы. Москва – Пpaгa: Научная книга, Ottovo nakladatelství, 2010. 424 pp. 
 KREJČÍ, Oskar: War. (Válka). Praha: Professional Publishing, 2010. 170 s. 
 KREJČÍ, Oskar: Geopolitika středoevropského prostoru. Pohled z Prahy a Bratislavy. Čtvrté, doplněné vydání. Praha: Professional Publishing, 2010. 400 pp. 
 KREJČÍ, Oskar: International Politics (Mezinárodní politika.) 4. aktualizované vydání. Praha: Ekopress, 2010. 752 pp. 
 KREJČÍ, Oskar: Geopolitics of the Central European Region. The view from Prague and Bratislava (Geopolitika středoevropského prostoru. Pohled z Prahy a Bratislavy.) Prague: Professional Publishing, 2009. 400 pp. 
KREJČÍ, Oskar: U.S. Foreign Policy (Zahraniční politika USA.) Prague: Professional Publishing, 2009. 437 pp. 
KREJČÍ, Oskar: International Politics (Mezinárodní politika.) Prague: Ekopress, 2007. 744 pp. 
KREJČÍ, Oskar: New Book about Elections. (Nová kniha o volbách.) Prague: Professional Publishing, 2006. 484 pp.  
KREJČÍ, Oskar: Geopolitics of the Central European Region. The view from Prague and Bratislava] Bratislava: Veda, 2005. 494 pp. (Free download, in English) 
KREJČÍ, Oskar: Political Psychology (Politická psychologie.) Prague: Ekopress, 2004. 320 pp. 
KREJČÍ, Oskar: International Politics (Mezinárodní politika.) Prague: Ekopress, 2001. 712 pp. 
KREJČÍ, Oskar: The Geopolitics of Central Europe (Geopolitika středoevropského prostoru. Horizonty zahraniční politiky České republiky a Slovenské republiky.) Prague: Ekopress, 2000. 320 pp. 
KREJČÍ, Oskar: The Nature of Today’s Crisis. (Povaha dnešní krize.) Prague: East Publishing, 1998. 224 pp. 
KREJČÍ, Oskar: International Politics (Mezinárodní politika.) Prague: Victoria Publishing, 1997. 512 pp.
KREJČÍ, Oskar: Czechoslovak National Interest. Boulder: East European Monographs, 1996, 362 pp. 
KREJČÍ, Oskar: History of Election in Bohemia and Moravia. Boulder: East European Monographs, 1995, 472 pp. 
KREJČÍ, Oskar: Book about Elections (Kniha o volbách.) Prague: Victoria Publishing, 1994. 354 pp.
KREJČÍ, Oskar: Czech National Interest and Geopolitics. (Český národní zájem a geopolitika.) Prague: Universe, 1993. 180 pp.
KREJČÍ, Oskar: Who Will Win Elections '92 (Kdo vyhraje volby '92.) Prague: Ucho, 1992. 144 pp.
Why This Crack: About Democracy And Velvet Revolution. (Hovory o demokracii a „sametové revoluci“.) Prague: Trio, 1991. 144 pp.
KREJČÍ, Oskar: USA and Balance of Power. (USA a mocenská rovnováha.) Prague: Svoboda, 1989. 352 pp.
KREJČÍ, Oskar: American Conservatism. (Americký konservatismus.) Prague: Svoboda – Pravda, 1987. 262 pp.
KREJČÍ, Oskar: Technological Illusions. (Technologické iluze. Ke kritice teorií stadií růstu.) Prague: Academia, 1986. 184 pp.

References

External links 
 ResearchGate – texts by Oskar Krejčí (Free download)
 ИноСМИ – Оскар Крейчи (in Russian)
 časopis !Argument - articles  by Oskar Krejčí (in Czech)
 portál Slovo – articles by Oskar Krejčí  (in Czech)
 Britské listy - articles by Oskar Krejčí (in Czech)

Czech political scientists
1948 births
Living people
StB